The Brister School House, in Winn Parish, Louisiana near Sikes, Louisiana, was built around 1915.  It was listed on the National Register of Historic Places in 2001.

It is a one-room schoolhouse built with aspects of Craftsman style.

It is located at Parish Road 240 and Brister School Rd.

References

School buildings on the National Register of Historic Places in Louisiana
One-room schoolhouses in Louisiana
National Register of Historic Places in Winn Parish, Louisiana
School buildings completed in 1915
American Craftsman architecture in Louisiana
1915 establishments in Louisiana